W. Chew “Chewie” Chan is a storyboard and comic book artist who has worked on several projects from (Iron Man, Buckaroo Banzai, and Cthulhu Tales) to significant movie productions (Superman Returns and Happy Feet). He is the Comics Consultant for the Kinokuniya Bookstores of Australia and was Graphic Novels Supervisor for Kennedy Miller Mitchell, where he also worked extensively on Warner Bros’ Justice League Mortal and Astonishing Tales.

References

External links
 Official website

Australian comics artists
Living people
Australian storyboard artists
Year of birth missing (living people)